The following is a timeline of the history of the city of Raleigh, North Carolina, USA.

Prior to 19th century

Prior to European colonists, the area was inhabited by indigenous tribes, including the Tuscarora and Occaneechi. Explorer John Lawson mentions "Tuskeraro", "Neus", "Schoccores and Achonechy Indians" in his journal. He also mentions the devastation from illnesses like smallpox and "distemper" on the native population which killed entire towns and left one sixth the original population in the area.
 1587 – In a venture sponsored by Sir Walter Raleigh, John White and a group of colonists land on Roanoke Island at the site of a former, abandoned settlement to found the "Cittie of Raleigh," about 190 miles from present-day Raleigh, NC. John White returns to England for supplies, leaving behind his granddaughter Virginia Dare, the first English child born in the New World.
 1590 – His return delayed by threats against England by the Spanish Armada, John White secures passage on a privateer. As the party stepped ashore, there was no sign of the colonists except the letters "CROATOAN" carved on a tree.  This abandoned site later became known as the "Lost Colony." 
 1701 – John Lawson, English explorer, led a 600-mile expedition starting in Charleston, SC and ending at the mouth of the Pamlico River.  His journey took him close to the site of what later became Raleigh, NC.
 1770 – Joel Lane, a planter, successfully lobbies the colonial General Assembly to create Wake County.
 1781 – Lane's property was the setting for a session of the state General Assembly.  At this time the settlement was known as Wake Courthouse, or Bloomsbury and contained a courthouse, a jail, a tavern or inn, and a log church called the Asbury Meetinghouse.
 1792
 The NC legislature authorizes the purchase of 1,000 acres (4 km2) of Joel Lane's land upon which to establish the city of "Raleigh" as the new center of state government.
 Raleigh is founded as the capital of North Carolina.
 1794
 State House built.
 December: State General Assembly convenes.
 1798 – Cemetery established.
 1799 – The North-Carolina Minerva and Raleigh advertiser relocates from Fayetteville to become the first Raleigh Newspaper.
 1800 – Raleigh population is 669.

19th century
 1801 – Raleigh Academy established.
 1804 – Casso's Inn opens.
 1813 – State Bank of North Carolina built.
 1817 – Episcopal Diocese of North Carolina established in Raleigh
 1819 – Raleigh Auxiliary Society for Colonizing the Free People of Colour of the United States established.
 1820 – Population: 2,674.
 1831
 January: A great fire destroys the capitol building.
 June: Capitol building burns down.
 1840
 Raleigh and Gaston Railroad begins operating.
 North Carolina State Capitol building constructed.
 1842 - Saint Mary's School (Raleigh, North Carolina) founded by the Episcopal Church.
 1846 – Raleigh Guards established.
 1850 – Charles Lee Smith house built.
 1853 – Christ Episcopal Church built.
 1857
 William Dallas Haywood becomes mayor.
 Peace Institute founded.
 1861 – May 20: North Carolina secedes from the United States and joins the Confederate States of America.
 1865
 April 13: Raleigh taken by Union forces.
 Raleigh Institute founded.
 Daily Sentinel newspaper begins publication.
 1867 - St. Augustine's University (North Carolina) founded.
 1868 – July 4: North Carolina readmitted to the United States.
1874 – Church of the Good Shepherd breaks away from Christ Church
 1875 – Institute for Colored Deaf, Dumb and Blind built.
 1878 – Court Room and Post Office built.
 1880 – The News & Observer in publication.
 1881 – Tabernacle Baptist Church built.
 1887 - Raleigh Water Works built 
 1889 – North Carolina College of Agriculture and Mechanic Arts opens.
 1890 – Union Station built.
 1891
 North Carolina Confederate Soldiers’ Home opens.
 Baptist Female University chartered.
 Electric streetcar begins operating.
 Governor's Mansion built.
 1892 – Centennial of city founding.
 1898 – First-Citizens Bank & Trust Company established.
 1900
 North Carolina Literary and Historical Association founded.
 Population: 13,643.

20th century

1900s-1940s
 1901 – Raney Memorial Library opens.
 1903 – North Carolina Division of Archives and History headquartered in Raleigh.
 1904 – Raleigh Woman's Club founded.
 1905 – James I. Johnson becomes mayor.
 1910 – Population: 19,218.
 1912 – City Auditorium opens.
 1913 – State Supreme Court Building constructed.
 1914 – Daughters of the American Revolution Caswell-Nash Chapter formed.
 1915 – North Carolina Division of Parks and Recreation headquartered in Raleigh.
 1920
 City area expanded.
 Population: 27,076.
 1922 – WPTF radio begins broadcasting.
 1923 – State Agricultural Building constructed.
 1924
 State Theatre opens.
 Roman Catholic Diocese of Raleigh officially established
 1929 – Raleigh Municipal Airport opens.
 1930 – The Mecca Restaurant opens.
 1932 – Raleigh Memorial Auditorium opens.
 1936 – Raleigh Little Theatre established.
 1938
 State Office Building constructed.
 Cooper's Barbeque in business.
 1940 – Carolinian newspaper begins publication.
 1943 – Raleigh–Durham Airport opens.
 1945 – Area of city: 12.5 square miles.
 1948 – Hi-Mount developed.
 1949 – Cameron Village shopping centre in business.

1950s-1990s
 1950
 Southern Railway station built.
 Population: 65,679.
 1951 – York Industrial Center established near city.
 1952 – Southland Speedway opens.
 1954 – Farm Bureau Insurance Company building constructed.
 1955 – Raleigh Farmers Market built.
 1956
 WRAL-TV (television) begins broadcasting.
 North Carolina Museum of Art opens.
 Occidental Life Insurance Company building constructed.
 1959 – Research Triangle Park development begins near city.
 1960
 Student Nonviolent Coordinating Committee founded in Raleigh.
 First Federal Bank Building constructed.
 1961 – Center Drive-In cinema active.
 1962 – Northwestern Mutual Insurance Company building constructed.
 1965 – Area of city: 34.1 square miles.
 1967 – North Hills Mall in business.
 1970 – Population: 122,830.
 1971 – Daughters of the American Revolution Micajah Bullock Chapter formed.
 1972
 Crabtree Valley Mall in business.
 State Bank of Raleigh and Capital Area Preservation nonprofit established.
 1975 – Raleigh Transit Authority established.
 1977 – Isabella Cannon becomes mayor.
 1978 – Haywood Hall Museum House established.
 1979 – Jain Study Center of North Carolina founded.
 1980 – Artsplosure begins.
 1985 – Piedmont Zen Group formed.
 1986 – Sister city relationship established with Hull, UK.
 1987 – David Price becomes U.S. representative for North Carolina's 4th congressional district.
 1988 – 1988 Raleigh tornado outbreak.
 1989 – Sister city relationship established with Compiègne, France.
 1990 – Population: 207,951.
 1993 – Raleigh City Museum opens.
 1995 – Historic Oak View County Park established.
 1998 – Animazement convention begins.
 1999 – 1999 Special Olympics World Summer Games.
 2000 – Population: 276,093.

21st century

2000s
 2001
 November: Raleigh mayoral election, 2001 held.
 December: Charles Meeker becomes mayor.
 Sister city relationship established with Rostock, Germany.
 2002 – Triangle Town Center shopping mall in business.
 2005 – Raleigh Home Movie Day begins. 
 2007 – Marbles Kids Museum opens.
 2008
 Raleigh Public Record in publication.
 David Price becomes U.S. representative for North Carolina's 4th congressional district again.
 Sister city relationship established with Xiangyang, China.

2010s
 2010 – Population: 403,892.
 2011
 Tornado outbreak of April 14–16, 2011.
 Contemporary Art Museum of Raleigh opens.
 Nancy McFarlane becomes mayor.
 2012 – Sister city relationship established with Nairobi, Kenya.
 2013 – April: Moral Mondays protest begins.
 2017 – Fire breaks out at Downtown Raleigh building, the largest the city has seen since the 1920s

2020s
 2020 – Population: 467,665.
 2022 – The 2022 Raleigh shootings occur, leaving five people dead and injuring two others.

See also
 Raleigh history
 List of mayors of Raleigh, North Carolina
 National Register of Historic Places listings in Wake County, North Carolina
 List of museums in Raleigh, North Carolina
 History of North Carolina
 Timelines of other cities in North Carolina: Asheville, Charlotte, Durham, Fayetteville, Greensboro, Wilmington, Winston-Salem

References

Bibliography

Published in 18th century

Published in 19th century
 
 
 Raleigh Directory. 1875
 1883
 1896
 
 1896

Published in 20th century
 Raleigh Directory. 1903
 1927
 
 
 
 
 Steven Stolpen, Raleigh: A Pictorial History (Norfolk, 1977).
 
 Elizabeth Reid Murray, Wake: Capital County of North Carolina, Vol.1 of Prehistory through Centennial (Raleigh, 1983)
 R.B., Reeves III, ed., Raleigh 1792-1992: A Bicentennial Celebration of North Carolina's Capital City  (Raleigh, 1992)
 Candy Lee Metz Beal,  Raleigh: The First 200 Years  (Raleigh, 1992)
 Linda Harris Edminsten and Linda Simmons-Henry, Culture Town: Life in Raleigh's African American Communities (Raleigh, 1993)
 David Perkins, ed.,  The News and Observer's Raleigh: A Living History of North Carolina's Capital (Winston-Salem, 1994)

Published in 21st century
 Jennifer A. Kulikowski and Kenneth E. Peters, Images of America: Historic Raleigh (Charleston, 2002)
  (via NCpedia)

External links

 Items related to Raleigh, North Carolina, various dates (via Digital Public Library of America)
 
 
 Raleigh-related archived websites: 
 
 
 Timeline of North Carolina, 
 

 
Raleigh